The following is a list of awards and nominations received by actress Megan Mullally.

Awards and nominations

Daytime Emmy Awards

Golden Globe Awards

Primetime Emmy Awards

Screen Actors Guild Awards

Miscelleanous awards

References

Mullally, Megan